Brian Ervine (born October 1951, Belfast) is a playwright, songwriter and teacher living in Belfast, Northern Ireland. The Northern Irish playwright St John Ervine (1883–1971) was a distant relative. In October 2010 he succeeded Dawn Purvis as the leader of the Progressive Unionist Party. Ervine's wife Linda serves as the Irish Language Officer at Turas, an Irish-language programme notable for its location in east Belfast.

Biography

He was educated at Grosvenor Grammar School, Belfast, a contemporary of future soccer legend George Best. He studied at Stranmillis University College, graduating with a degree in education, and then at Queen's University, Belfast, graduating with a degree in Theology (BD). He subsequently taught English and Religion at Orangefield High School in east Belfast. Alumni of Orangefield include Van Morrison, Brian Keenan and Ervine's brother, David.

His play, Somme Day Mourning, tells the story of working class east Belfast men who gave their lives at the battle of The Somme in 1916. The play also features original music and lyrics written by Ervine.

In 2005, at a special ceili in the Great Hall of Stormont Parliament Building, hosted by Tommy Sands of Downtown Radio, David Ervine sang "Leaving Dalriada", an emotive ballad written by Brian Ervine, about an exile ordered to leave the country by a gunman. Brian Ervine presented "Dalriada", a local radio programme focused on Ulster-Scots culture.

When his brother, David Ervine, leader of the Progressive Unionist Party, died in 2007, Brian Ervine stood for the leadership of the party. He lost to Dawn Purvis. On 16 October 2010 he was elected leader of the PUP. At his brother David's funeral, Ervine was pictured in the international media standing next to his brother's widow, Jeanette Ervine, while she was embraced by the president of Sinn Féin, Gerry Adams.

In his address to mourners at the funeral, Brian Ervine said his brother was able to "translate the bloodstained tragic prose of violence and hatred to the poetry of peaceful co-existence . . . He had the guts and the courage to climb out of the traditional trenches, meet the enemy in no-man's land and play ball with him."

References

External links
  Brian Ervine performs "Bloody Road to the Somme", from his play, Somme Day Mourning

British songwriters
British dramatists and playwrights
1951 births
Living people
Progressive Unionist Party politicians
British male dramatists and playwrights
Alumni of Stranmillis University College
Schoolteachers from Northern Ireland
Alumni of Queen's University Belfast
People educated at Grosvenor Grammar School